Ntem is a department of Woleu-Ntem Province in northern Gabon. The capital lies at Bitam. It borders Equatorial Guinea and Cameroon. It had a population of 49,712 in 2013.

Towns and villages

References

Woleu-Ntem Province
Departments of Gabon